The Shining Sea Bikeway is a rail trail on Cape Cod in Falmouth, Massachusetts, United States.
Steamship Authority ferry terminal in Woods Hole to North Falmouth.

History 
The trail was built on the right-of-way of the Old Colony Railroad's Woods Hole branch line, which was built in 1872. In 1893, the New York, New Haven and Hartford Railroad (NH) leased the Old Colony and took over service on the line. Passenger service was discontinued in 1964, the NH merged with the Penn Central system in 1969, and Penn Central went bankrupt in 1970.

The creation of the trail began in 1977, when the Town of Falmouth purchased the section of the bankrupt line running from downtown Falmouth to Woods Hole for $329,000. In 2009, the trail was extended an additional  from downtown Falmouth to North Falmouth. Freight service on this section ceased in 1989.

While the Woods Hole-Falmouth section of former railroad is owned by the Town of Falmouth, the Falmouth-North Falmouth section is owned by the Massachusetts Department of Transportation and is not officially abandoned.

The name of the trail is a reference to the patriotic song "America the Beautiful". The author of the song's lyrics, Katherine Lee Bates, was born in Falmouth, and there is a plaque commemorating her poem near mile marker 2.

The Bourne Rail Trail is a planned  rail trail paralleling the active rail line from North Falmouth to Bourne, where it will connect with the Cape Cod Canal path. In 2019 and 2020, the state awarded $385,000 for design of the first two phases. An additional $499,000 was awarded in 2022.

Route description
The Shining Sea Bikeway's northern trailhead is at the former site of the North Falmouth Railroad Station on County Road in North Falmouth. For the first , the path runs adjacent to active track used to haul trash off-Cape from the Upper Cape Regional Transfer Station on Joint Base Cape Cod. The path runs south roughly parallel to Route 28A through the villages of North Falmouth and West Falmouth. Between North and West Falmouth, it passes through a cranberry bog and crosses the horse trails at Bourne Farm. In West Falmouth, it passes near Chapoquoit Beach and then runs through the Sippewissett Salt Marsh.

After the salt marsh, the path turns southeast and climbs slightly into the village of Sippewissett and then turns southwest and enters downtown Falmouth. At this point, there is a connection across Route 28A to the southern end of the Moraine Trail, including Goodwill Park, Grew's Pond, and Falmouth Pumping Station. In Falmouth, the path runs through a Steamship Authority parking lot and passes the former Falmouth Railroad Station, which is used as a bus station.

At Woods Hole Road, the path reaches its downtown parking lot, which was its northernmost trailhead until the 2009 extension. It then crosses Woods Hole Road and continues southwest past Salt Pond to Surf Drive Beach. Turning east, it passes through another Steamship Authority parking lot and ends at the Steamship Authority ferry terminal and the former site of the Woods Hole Railroad Station in the village of Woods Hole.

See also
 Cape Cod Rail Trail

References

Further reading

External links

 Bikeways Committee, Town of Falmouth
 Friends of Falmouth Bikeways

Rail trails in Massachusetts
Parks in Barnstable County, Massachusetts
Falmouth, Massachusetts
Tourist attractions in Barnstable County, Massachusetts